Springboard International Bilingual School (SIBS) is an international school in Gucheng Village (古城段), Houshayu Town (后沙峪镇), Shunyi District, Beijing. It has Kindergarten, Lower Primary, Upper Primary, and Secondary (Middle and high school) divisions.

References

External links
 Springboard International Bilingual School
  Springboard International Bilingual School

Schools in Shunyi District
International schools in Beijing